Alex Healy (born January 15, 1989) is a Canadian Touring Car racing driver.

Career
After a successful stint in karting in Ottawa (NCKC), Montreal (SRA) and in the Florida Winter Tour (SRA, 2005–2008) Healy began car racing in the Canadian Touring Car Championship in 2008 in a shared car, a 2003 Honda Civic coupe, in the Touring Car class. At the end of the 2008 season, Alex purchased, with help from family and friends, a much faster 2003 Acura RSX from CTCC Super Touring Champions (2008) Krikorian Motorsports, originally built by King Motorsports as a World Speed Challenge car. In 2009, Alex moved up to the Super Touring Class. He finished the eight-event season in the RSX with 2 second-place finishes, and earning 7th overall in the Championship.

Inside Track Motorsports News named Alex Healy, as voted by readers in its annual Readers' Choice Awards, as Up and Coming Canadian Road Racer of the Year for 2009.

In 2010, Alex signed with Lombardi Racing of Montreal and raced in the Super Touring class in a four-door Honda SI for the first two events at Mosport finishing 7th in both events. In June 2010, Alex Healy Racing announced that Alex was parting company with Lombardi on a friendly basis to return to compete in his RSX for the remaining 2010 CTCC events.

Healy returned to CTCC series in 2011 in his redesigned and upgraded RSX, and completed six of the seven scheduled events. Unfortunately, the RSX encountered many mechanical issues throughout the 2011 season, including two transmissions and an engine failure. This resulted in a high number of DNFs. He finished the series in 8th place overall.

In 2012, Alex Healy appointed a new crew and received increased support from his main sponsor. The RSX had a significant power train upgrade with major improvement to aerodynamics, expecting to see improved handling, performance and reliability. Healy returned to the CTCC series with sufficient funding to compete for the entire season of 8 events (16 races).

In 2013, Healy spent the pre-season doing a complete re-build of his RSX- including a new power train and revamped support systems. He completed 6 of 7 race weekends and reached the podium on five of the weekends, resulting in an overall 4th in the CTCC Super Touring championship. 2013 was his most successful season in touring car racing.

In 2014, Alex Healy tested a car for the Porche Cup series and competed in the Canadian National Karting Championships in Mont Tremblant, QC. Starting 5th on the grid of the Briggs & Stratton senior class final, he had to settle for a 14th-place finish after being hit from behind early in the race.

In 2015 Alex sold his Acura RSX to an American former pro racer based in Pennsylvania. He is taking a break from competitive racing by competing with the GASTops Chumps for Charity team and doing selected Karting events.

In 2015-2019 Alex Healy Racing (Alex Healy, Pierre Clavet, Jean-Mi Isabelle and Tyler Givogue) competed in the annual Pole Position 4-Hour Enduro at Kart-O-Mania in Montreal, winning the prestigious event in 2019 and reaching the podium in three previous events.

Alex is the co-founder and President of RH Precision Unmanned, a Aerial Mapping & Surveying, Thermographic Inspections, and Building Sciences firm. RH Precision employs state-of-the-art drones for engineering projects throughout Ontario and Quebec.

2013 CTCC Super Touring results

2012 CTCC Super Touring results

2011 CTCC Super Touring results

2010 CTCC Super Touring results

2009 CTCC Super Touring results

References

External links
Lombardi Racing Lombardi Racing website
CCTCC Website Castrol Canadian Touring Car Championship website
NCKC Website National Capital Karting Club, Ottawa (NCKC) website
Florida Winter Tour Florida Winter Tour website
SRA Karting, Montreal SRA Karting website
Pictures of RSX in 2004 King Motorsports
Inside Track News Blog Inside Track Magazine – News Blog, January 6, 2010
Globe and Mail Article Globe and Mail – "Canadian Touring Car chase gears up" May 19, 2010
Alex Healy Racing Press Release "Alex Healy and Lombardi part company", June 24, 2010
Alex Healy Racing Press Release "Alex Healy's New Look for 2011", April 14, 2011
Alex Healy Racing Press Release "Alex Healy on Podium at the Honda Toronto Indy", July 10, 2011
Alex Healy Racing Press Release "Unfinished Business", May 17, 2012

1989 births
Racing drivers from Ontario
Living people
Sportspeople from Ottawa